Melanoxanthus anticus is a species of click beetle belonging to the family Elateridae.

References 

Beetles described in 1957